The GAZ-33097 is a transport truck with a 2,000 kg payload, built by the Russian GAZ factory. 

The GAZ-33097 is designed to provide cargo transportation in harsh terrain and adverse weather conditions. It is equipped with power steering, driving axles with cam-type self-blocking differential, and radial tires with a pressure regulation system. It is a development of the GAZ-66-40 truck.

Specifications
power steering system
driving axles with self-blocking differential of cam type
Wheel drive formula 4 x 4
GVW, 6,200 kg
Payload, 2,000 kg
GTW, 3,500 kg
Overall dimensions, (L x W x H), mm 6,125 x 2,340 x 2,505
Wheelbase, 3,770 mm
radial tires with the pressure regulation system
Cargo platform dimensions, 3,300 x 2,050 x 890 mm
Engine type GAZ 5441 diesel
Gear box manual, synchronised, five forward speeds and one reverse
Transfer box mechanical, with direct and
reduction gear
Steering re-circulating ball/nut or worm/roller,
hydraulic booster
Brake system dual circuit, hydraulic type, with
vacuum booster in each circuit
Cabin two seats, driver's seat fully adjustable and suspended
Max speed, 85/90 km/h
Fuel consumption, 16 liter/100 km, at constant speed of 60 km/h

GAS-33097 modifications
Basic Chassis Equipped with the platform Equipped with the winch
Weight, 3,655 4,130 4,370 kg
GVW, 6,200 6,425 kg
Overall dimensions, 6,125 x 2,340 x 2,505 6,125 x 2,340 x 2,505 6,425 x 2,340 x 2,505 mm

See also
GAZ-2975 "Tigr"
GAZ-3937 "Vodnik"
Ural-4320
UAZ-469
Russian Ground Forces

GAZ Group trucks
Military trucks
Military vehicles of Russia